M'lang Football Club is a Filipino semi-professional association football club based in M'lang, Cotabato. M'lang has played at the final phase of the PFF National Men's Club Championship.

References

Football clubs in the Philippines
Sports in Cotabato